HVDC Tian–Guang is a bipolar 500 kV HVDC system used for transmitting power generated at Tianshengqiao Hydroelectric Plant to Guangzhou. HVDC Tian–Guan, which was built by Siemens and inaugurated in 2001 is capable of transmitting a maximum power of 1,800 MW.

There is a parallel running AC powerline via Pingguo, Laibin, Wuzhou and Luodong, but the DC line helps damping oscillations and stabilizing the system.

References

External links 

 http://www.ptd.siemens.de/CIGRE_Workshop_0706.pdf

Energy infrastructure completed in 2001
Electric power infrastructure in China
HVDC transmission lines
2001 establishments in China